When All the Laughter Has Gone is the debut album by the Finnish doom metal band Dolorian. Released in 1999, it is often regarded as a prime example of blackened doom metal.

Track listing
"Desolated Colours" – 07:19
"My Weary Eyes" – 08:22
"A Part of Darkness" – 06:24
"When All Laughter Has Gone" – 05:52
"Collapsed" – 09:18
"Fields" – 04:45
"With Scorn / Perish" – 11:11

Credits
Anti Ittna Haapapuro – vocals, electric guitar
Ari Kukkohovi – bass guitar, drums, electric guitar
Jussi Ontero – keyboard

References 

1999 albums
Dolorian albums